Headwall Pond is a very small ice-covered pond in the Labyrinth of Wright Valley, in the McMurdo Dry Valleys of Antarctica. The pond lies along a rock headwall close northeast of Craig Pond. The descriptive name was suggested by the United States Antarctic Program field party that sampled the pond in 2003–04.

References

Lakes of Victoria Land
McMurdo Dry Valleys